Paúl Fernando Carrera Velasteguí, known better as Polo Carrera (born January 11, 1945 in Quito), is an Ecuadorian retired football player and former manager. He has played for clubs in Ecuador and Uruguay, as well as the Ecuador football team

Club career
Carrera started his career at LDU Quito at the age of 15 in 1960, where he stayed until transferred to Peñarol of Uruguay in 1968.

He then transferred to cross-town team River Plate de Montevideo in 1970. He then returned to Ecuador to play for several clubs until his retirement in 1984.

He was the all-time top goalscorer in the Copa Libertadores tournament for LDU Quito with 12 goals, until surpassed by Patricio Urrutia.

Coaching career
Since retiring from football, Carrera started his coaching career in 1990 with LDU Quito as a manager at senior level. He was the senior team coach from 1990 to 1991, where he guided the club to their improbable 4th Serie A title in 1990, after a 15-year title drought. He later coached the Ecuador national team in 1998 with little success.

Starting in 2000 he held various elected positions in government.

In August 2009 he was named as manager at Sociedad Deportiva Aucas.

Honors

As a player
Peñarol
Primera División: 1968

El Nacional
Serie A: 1972

LDU Quito
Serie A: 1975

As a manager
LDU Quito
Serie A: 1990

ESPOLI
Serie B: 1993

References

External links

1945 births
Living people
Association football forwards
Ecuadorian footballers
Ecuador international footballers
1967 South American Championship players
1975 Copa América players
L.D.U. Quito footballers
S.D. Quito footballers
Fluminense FC players
Barcelona S.C. footballers
Peñarol players
Club Atlético River Plate (Montevideo) players
C.D. El Nacional footballers
C.D. Universidad Católica del Ecuador footballers
Ecuadorian expatriate footballers
Expatriate footballers in Brazil
Expatriate footballers in Uruguay
Ecuadorian expatriate sportspeople in Uruguay
Ecuadorian football managers
L.D.U. Quito managers
C.D. El Nacional managers
S.D. Aucas managers
S.D. Quito managers
Ecuador national football team managers